The NWA Hawaii Tag Team Championship was the primary tag team title of 50th State Big Time Wrestling and was defended between 1952 and 1979 when it was phased out. The title was later revived by the current incarnation of NWA Hawaii in 2000. It is the earliest regional tag team title in to be defended in the Pacific coast of the United States, along with the NWA Pacific Northwest Tag Team Championship, and was originally defended in Honolulu, Hawaii. As of 2007, it is defended in Kalihi, Kaneohe and Wahiawa, Hawaii.

Title history

References

50th State Big Time Wrestling championships
National Wrestling Alliance championships
Tag team wrestling championships
National Wrestling Alliance state wrestling championships
Professional wrestling in Hawaii